Route 22, or Highway 22, can refer to:

International
 European route E22

Argentina
 National Route 22

Australia
 Great Western Highway, Parramatta Road

Austria
 Donauufer Autobahn

Canada
 Alberta Highway 22
 Alberta Highway 22X
 British Columbia Highway 22
 Manitoba Highway 22
 Nova Scotia Trunk 22
 Ontario Highway 22
 Prince Edward Island Route 22
 Saskatchewan Highway 22

China 
  G22 Expressway

Costa Rica
 National Route 22

Czech Republic
 I/22 Highway; Czech: Silnice I/22

Finland
 Finnish national road 22

Iceland
 Route 22 (Iceland)

India
  National Highway 22 (India)

Iran
 Road 22

Ireland
  N22 road (Ireland)

Israel
Highway 22 (Israel)

Italy
 Autostrada A22

Japan
 Japan National Route 22

Korea, South
 National Route 22
Gukjido 22

New Zealand
 State Highway 22

Paraguay
 National Route 22

United Kingdom
 British A22 (Eastbourne-London)
 M22 motorway (Northern Ireland)
 A22 road (Northern Ireland)

United States
 Interstate 22
 U.S. Route 22
 Alabama State Route 22
 Arkansas Highway 22
 California State Route 22
 County Route A22 (California)
 County Route J22 (California)
 County Route S22 (California)
 Colorado State Highway 22
 Connecticut Route 22
 Florida State Road 22
 County Road 22 (Gulf County, Florida)
 County Road 22 (Liberty County, Florida)
 County Road 22 (Wakulla County, Florida)
 Georgia State Route 22
 Hawaii Route 22 (former)
 Idaho State Highway 22
 Illinois Route 22
 Indiana State Road 22
 Iowa Highway 22
 K-22 (Kansas highway)
 Kentucky Route 22
 Louisiana Highway 22
 Maine State Route 22
 Maryland Route 22
 Massachusetts Route 22
 M-22 (Michigan highway)
 Minnesota State Highway 22
 County Road 22 (Chisago County, Minnesota)
 County Road 22 (Hennepin County, Minnesota)
 County Road 22 (Washington County, Minnesota)
 Missouri Route 22
 Nebraska Highway 22
 Nevada State Route 22 (former)
 New Jersey Route 22 (former)
 County Route C22 (Bergen County, New Jersey)
 County Route 22 (Monmouth County, New Jersey)
 County Route 22 (Ocean County, New Jersey)
 New Mexico State Road 22
 New York State Route 22
 New York State Route 22B
 County Route 22 (Chautauqua County, New York)
 County Route 22 (Chenango County, New York)
 County Route 22 (Columbia County, New York)
 County Route 22 (Dutchess County, New York)
 County Route 22 (Genesee County, New York)
 County Route 22 (Greene County, New York)
 County Route 22 (Oneida County, New York)
 County Route 22 (Orange County, New York)
 County Route 22 (Oswego County, New York)
 County Route 22 (Otsego County, New York)
 County Route 22 (Putnam County, New York)
 County Route 22 (Saratoga County, New York)
 County Route 22 (Schoharie County, New York)
 County Route 22 (Schuyler County, New York)
 County Route 22 (St. Lawrence County, New York)
 County Route 22 (Suffolk County, New York)
 County Route 22 (Ulster County, New York)
 North Carolina Highway 22
 North Dakota Highway 22
 Ohio State Route 22 (1923-1927) (former)
 Oklahoma State Highway 22
 Oregon Route 22
 Pennsylvania Route 22 (1920s) (former)
 South Carolina Highway 22
 South Dakota Highway 22
 Tennessee State Route 22
 Texas State Highway 22
 Texas State Highway Spur 22
 Farm to Market Road 22
 Texas Park Road 22
 Utah State Route 22
 Virginia State Route 22
 Virginia State Route 22 (1918-1933) (former)
 Washington State Route 22
 Primary State Highway 22 (Washington) (former)
 Wisconsin Highway 22
 Wyoming Highway 22

Territories
 Puerto Rico Highway 22

Vietnam 
 National Route 22

See also 
List of A22 roads
List of highways numbered 22A